St. John's Chapel of St. Michael's Parish is a historic Episcopal church at Easton, Talbot County, Maryland. It is a granite Gothic Revival ruin. The building measures 35 feet wide and 50 feet deep. The chapel was built in about 1835 and abandoned around 1895.

It was listed on the National Register of Historic Places in 1973.

References

External links
, including undated photo, at Maryland Historical Trust

Churches in Talbot County, Maryland
Easton, Maryland
Churches on the National Register of Historic Places in Maryland
Episcopal church buildings in Maryland
Churches completed in 1835
19th-century Episcopal church buildings
National Register of Historic Places in Talbot County, Maryland